De Bente is a smock mill in Dalen, Netherlands. It was built in 1814. The mill has been restored to full working order. It is listed as a Rijksmonument, number 44563

History
De Bente was built in 1814 It replaced a mill that had been burnt down on 12 December 1813, through the actions of Cossacks attacking the French garrison in Coevorden. This mill was a post mill. De Bente worked until 1944 when two sails were lost. The other pair of sails were lost in 1957. The mill was later demolished, leaving the base which was incorporated into a modern mill. It was restored in 1977 by millwright J D Medendorp of Zuidlaren. A new smock was built on the existing base. Machinery from a demolished windmill at Großheide, Lower Saxony, Germany was incorporated. In 1994, miller Hans Petit rented the mill, and had it restored  to working order. In 2001, a third pair of millstones was installed. The mill produces about three tonnes of flour a week by windpower.

Description

De Bente is what the Dutch describe as an "achtkante stellingmolen", an eight-sided smock mill with a stage. The mill has a three-storey smock on a two-storey base. The smock and cap are thatched. They are carried on a cast-iron windshaft dating from 1866, which originally came from a windmill at Koekange and has been shortened. It was cast by the millwrights Enthoven of The Hague. The wooden clasp arm Brake wheel has 60 cogs. It drives the wallower at the top of the upright shaft. The wallower has 33 cogs. At the bottom of the upright shaft, the great spur wheel with 115 cogs drives two lantern pinion stone nuts, each with 33 staves. There are two pairs of millstones which are  diameter. One pair are of Cullen stones, the other pair have a Cullen runner stone on a French Burr bedstone. A third pair of stones was added in 2001.

Millers
Hans Petit (since 1994)

Reference for above:-

Public access
De Bente is open on Wednesdays and Thursdays from 13:00 to 17:00, on Saturdays from 10:00 to 17:00 and at other times by appointment.

References

External links

De Bente website 

Windmills in Drenthe
Smock mills in the Netherlands
Windmills completed in 1814
Rijksmonuments in Drenthe
Octagonal buildings in the Netherlands
De Bente, Dalen